Kunja may be:
Kunja language (Papuan)
Kunja language (Australian)